Süngülü can refer to:

 Süngülü, Çivril
 Süngülü, Posof